Goniodiscaster forficulatus is a species of sea stars in the family Oreasteridae.

References

Oreasteridae
Starfish described in 1875